Beyond Chutzpah: On the Misuse of Anti-Semitism and the Abuse of History is a book by Norman Finkelstein published by the University of California Press in August 2005. The book's focus is on a critique of Israel supporters' defense of Israel's stance in the Israel-Palestine conflict, including their use of the concept of anti-semitism. A major theme of the book is a polemic with Alan Dershowitz's earlier book The Case for Israel (2003) (see also Dershowitz–Finkelstein affair).

Finkelstein on the book

Finkelstein's doctoral dissertation was to disassemble a book by Joan Peters, From Time Immemorial (1984), which claimed that Palestine had been largely empty in the early 20th century, and that both Jewish and Arab ethnic groups were immigrants. Finkelstein declared the book a fraud.

Two decades later, Finkelstein saw the record of the Israel-Palestine conflict as much less complex than previously. Finkelstein claims that the official Zionist "Exodus version," that Arab radio broadcasts had instructed the Palestinians to flee, has been largely swept away. He believes that proof of this became available in the 1960s but had little impact. In the late 1980s, however, some studies, including some by Israelis, claimed to dispel much of what Finkelstein refers to as "the Zionist mythology" enveloping the origins of the conflict. Some scholarly debate now focuses on much narrower questions such as whether what in Finkelstein's view was "ethnic cleansing" was the intentional consequence of Zionist policy or the unintentional by-product of the 1948 Arab-Israeli war. The topic remains controversial, particularly in Israel, where mainstream historians continue to dispute the view of Israel's 1948 war of independence presented by Finkelstein.

In Beyond Chutzpah he analyses "The Not-So-New 'New Anti-Semitism'" from published sources. Finkelstein argues that the spectre of the "new anti-semitism" has been invented by supporters of Israel to brand any serious criticisms of Israel's human rights abuses as anti-semitism. The aim, Finkelstein contends, is to silence criticism of Israel's policies and to provide a cover for that country's expansionistic and illegal policies in the Palestinian territories. In the second part he analyses Alan Dershowitz's book The Case for Israel (2003).

Dershowitz lawsuit
In Beyond Chutzpah Finkelstein documents what he claims is the falsification of Israel's human rights record by Dershowitz and his plagiarism of research from Joan Peters' book From Time Immemorial. In response, Dershowitz's lawyers wrote letters to the University of California Press threatening a lawsuit if they published the book. At one point, Dershowitz called on the Governor of California, Arnold Schwarzenegger, to intervene on his behalf, to stop the book from being published, but the Governor refused. Eventually, Dershowitz backed off and the book was published by UC Press, albeit with some minor modifications as a result of Dershowitz's threat.

Reviews
Amahl Bishara reviewing the book for 2005/2006 issue of The Arab Studies Journal wrote that the book is "an extremely well-researched account" that effectively "dismantles" Dershowitz's arguments.

Stephanie Farmer writing for Arab Studies Quarterly in 2006 echoed Bishara, arguing that "Finkelstein' s examination reveals more than the dubious scholarship of Dershowitz", raising "important questions on the general lack of academic standards for Zionist scholars" and gets "the human rights record of the abuse of Palestinians to penetrate the bulwark of Zionism in the academy".

In 2007, As'ad AbuKhalil in his review for Journal of Palestine Studies, wrote that "This is a book that should be recommended to all", as it successfully and carefully rebuts "the crude (and not-so-crude) elements of Israeli propaganda in the West".

Also in 2007, Lisa Hajjar writing for Human Rights Review noted that the book is a rather successful critique of Dershowitz claims, although notes that it is strongly polemical, perhaps too strongly, and that the real value of the books is in its analytical footnotes and appendices rather than in the aggressive prose.

Baruch Kimmerling, professor of sociology at the Hebrew University of Jerusalem wrote in 2007 that Beyond Chutzpah is "the most comprehensive, systematic, and well-documented work of its kind. It is one of the harshest—rational and nonemotional—texts about the daily practices of the occupation and colonization of the Palestinian territories by Israel, and it is an excellent demonstration of how and why the blind defenders of Israel, by basing their arguments on false facts and figures, actually bring more damage than gains to their cause."

Marc Saperstein, professor of Jewish history at George Washington University, wrote in conclusion of his review of Beyond Chutzpah for Middle East Journal: "if you are looking for a book that gathers for polemical purposes every anti-Israel argument in the arsenal of its opponents, and if you enjoy the rhetorical style of the arrogant academic pit bull, this may be the book for you. If you are looking for balance, fairness, context, a critical weighing of evidence on different sides of a controversial issue ... you will not find them here".

Awards 
The University of California Press was awarded a prize for "sustained contributions to the promotion and defense of academic freedom in the Middle East and North Africa" by the Middle East Studies Association for publishing the book in the face of Dershowitz's threats.

See also
 Dershowitz-Finkelstein affair
 New Historians

References

2005 non-fiction books
Books by Norman Finkelstein
Books critical of Israel
Israeli–Palestinian conflict books
University of California Press books